American singer Jessica Simpson has released seven studio albums, four compilation albums, three video albums, nineteen singles, and fifteen music videos. Her debut album, Sweet Kisses (1999), was released through Columbia Records, reached number 25 on the US Billboard 200 albums chart, and was certified double-platinum by the Recording Industry Association of America (RIAA). The album sold 1.9 million copies in the US and produced three singles.  Simpson's debut single, "I Wanna Love You Forever", reached number 3 on the Billboard Hot 100 and was certified platinum by the RIAA. In 2001, Simpson released her second studio effort, titled Irresistible, which failed to match the success of Sweet Kisses.  Irresistible peaked at number 6 in the United States and has sold 755,000 copies. Her third studio album, In This Skin, was released in August 2003. Guided by the publicity of her reality TV show, Newlyweds, that album became the best-selling effort of her career, achieving a peak position of number 2 and triple platinum certification in the US. By 2009, In This Skin had sold 2.9 million copies in the US and produced four singles. In 2004, Simpson released her fourth studio and her first Christmas album, Rejoyce: The Christmas Album. It reached number 14 in the US and was certified gold by the RIAA. As of February 2009, Rejoyce has sold 669,000 copies in the US.

In 2006, following a move to Epic Records, Simpson released her fifth studio album, A Public Affair. The album debuted and peaked at number 5 in the US and was certified gold by the RIAA. A Public Affair has sold 300,000 copies in the US and spawned three singles. The album's title track, the second single from the album, reached number 14 on the Hot 100 and topped the Billboard Hot Dance Club Play chart. The single was eventually certified gold by the RIAA. After deciding to return to her roots of country music in 2008, Simpson signed a record deal with Columbia Nashville, the country imprint of Columbia Records, and released Do You Know, her sixth studio and first country album. The album debuted at number 4 on the Billboard 200 and number 1 on the Billboard Top Country Albums chart, and has shifted 173,000 copies. Simpson had departed from Sony Music by 2010 and signed a record deal with Eleveneleven records. In October 2010, Sony released a compilation album entitled Playlist: The Very Best of Jessica Simpson. Her seventh studio and second holiday album, Happy Christmas, was released in November 2010 through Primary Wave. The album peaked at number 123 on the Billboard 200.

Albums

Studio albums

Compilation albums

Box sets

Singles

As main artist

Promotional singles

Other charted songs

Other appearances

Videography

Music videos

Notes
Notes
A: "Angels" did not enter the Billboard Hot 100, but peaked at number 6 on the Bubbling Under Hot 100 Singles chart.
B: "These Boots Are Made for Walkin'" did not enter Belgium's Ultratop 50 Flanders chart, but it did chart at number 10 on the Ultratip chart.
C: "I Belong to Me" did not enter the Billboard Hot 100, but peaked at number 10 on the Bubbling Under Hot 100 Singles chart.
D: "Remember That" did not enter the Billboard Hot 100, but peaked at number 1 on the Bubbling Under Hot 100 Singles chart.
E: "You Spin Me Round (Like a Record)" did not enter the Billboard Hot 100, but peaked at number 21 on the Bubbling Under Hot 100 Singles chart.

References

External links
Jessica Simpson videography at MTV.com
[ Jessica Simpson discography] at AllMusic

Discography
Pop music discographies
Discographies of American artists